Jonathan Zaccaï (born 22 July 1970) is a Belgian actor, film director and screenwriter. He is the nephew of René Kalisky. 

His acting credits include The Beat That My Heart Skipped, A Distant Neighborhood, The True Story of My Life in Rouen, The Role of Her Life, They Came Back.

He received the Magritte Award for Best Actor for Private Lessons.

Filmography

References

External links

1970 births
Living people
Belgian film directors
Belgian screenwriters
Magritte Award winners
20th-century Belgian male actors
21st-century Belgian male actors
Belgian male television actors
Belgian male film actors
Belgian film producers
Male actors from Brussels
Belgian Jews
Belgian people of Polish-Jewish descent